Macronemurini is a tribe within the family Myrmeleontidae, the antlions.

References

External links 

Myrmeleontidae
Insect tribes